Purushottam School of Engineering and Technology (PSET) is a private co-aid diploma engineering college affiliated to SCTE & VT, which is located in semi rural place of Mandiakudar. Its infrastructure is half shared with degree college campus of PIET.

Admission process 
The students are admitted through DET, Odisha which is a state gov. organized national level entrance test.

References

State Council for Technical Education & Vocational Training
All India Council for Technical Education
Engineering colleges in Odisha
Universities and colleges in Rourkela
Educational institutions established in 2008
2008 establishments in Orissa